Eremosuchus is an extinct genus of sebecosuchian mesoeucrocodylian. Fossils have been found from El Kohol, Algeria of Eocene age. It had serrated, ziphodont teeth.

The genus was originally referred to the family Trematochampsidae in 1989. A close relation to the baurusuchids was also considered. However, it was only tentatively assigned to this family on the basis of a few features of the cranial skeleton. Some features, such as a broad concave symphysis and laterally compressed teeth, are not restricted to the trematochampsids and occur in some sebecosuchians such as Baurusuchus and Sebecus. Other features such as the surangular forming part of the craniomandibular articulation can also be found in many basal mesoeucrocodylians. A later phylogenetic analysis placed Eremosuchus within the suborder Sebecosuchia. It is now thought to be one of many putatively assigned sebecosuchians that cannot be firmly placed within any one family. It is thought to be the closest relative of the genus Pehuenchesuchus.

References

Eocene crocodylomorphs
Paleogene reptiles of Africa
Prehistoric pseudosuchian genera